The Archdiocese of Santiago de Guatemala is a Latin Church ecclesiastical territory or archdiocese of the Catholic Church in Guatemala. It is a primatial metropolitan see with six suffragan dioceses in its ecclesiastical province.

Special churches 
Its cathedral is the Catedral Primada Metropolitana de Santiago, is the episcopal see in the national capital Ciudad de Guatemala.
 
It also has 
 the former Cathedral, a World Heritage Site: Catedral de San José, Antigua Guatemala, Sacatepéquez
 a Minor Basilica, National Shrine: Basílica de Nuestra Señora del Rosario, Ciudad de Guatemala, Guatemala
 other National Shrine: Iglesia de San Francisco el Grande, Antigua Guatemala, Sacatepéquez
 further Shrines: Santuario Arquidiocesano del Señor San José, Ciudad de Guatemala, Guatemala and Santuario Expiatorio al Sagrado Corazón de Jesús, Ciudad de Guatemala, Guatemala

History 
 It was erected 18 December 1534, as the Diocese of Guatemala, on territory split off from the then Diocese of Santo Domingo.
 On 1561.06.21 it lost territory to establish the Diocese of Vera Paz
 It was elevated to Metropolitan Archdiocese of Guatemala on 16 December 1743. 
 It lost territory repeatedly : on 1842.09.28 to establish the then Diocese of San Salvador, on 1921.07.27 to establish the then Roman Catholic Diocese of Quetzaltenango, Los Altos (now also a metropolitan archdiocese) and the then Apostolic Vicariate of Verapaz and Petén, on 1951.03.10 to establish the dioceses of Jalapa (its suffragan), Sololá and the Zacapa, on 1969.05.09 to establish Territorial Prelature of Escuintla and on 1996.04.27 to establish its suffragan Diocese of Santa Rosa de Lima.
 It enjoyed papal visits from Pope John Paul II in March 1983, February 1996 and July 2002.
 It was renamed on 23 April 2013 as Metropolitan Archdiocese of Santiago de Guatemala

Province 
Its ecclesiastical province comprises the Metropolitan's own Archbishopric and the following suffragan bishoprics : 
 Roman Catholic Diocese of Escuintla
 Roman Catholic Diocese of Jalapa
 Roman Catholic Diocese of San Francisco de Asís de Jutiapa
 Roman Catholic Diocese of Santa Rosa de Lima
 Roman Catholic Diocese of Verapaz, Cobán 
 Roman Catholic Diocese of Zacapa y Santo Cristo de Esquipulas.

Episcopal ordinaries
Bishops of Guatemala

Archbishops of Guatemala

Archbishops of Santiago de Guatemala
 Óscar Julio Vian Morales, S.D.B. (see above April 25, 2013 – February 24, 2018)
 Gonzalo de Villa y Vásquez, S.J. (July 9, 2020 – present)

Coadjutor bishops
Fernando Ortiz de Hinojosa (1598); did not take effect
Francisco de Paul García Peláez (1843–1845)
Mario Casariego y Acevedo, C.R.S. (1963–1964); future Cardinal

Auxiliary bishops
Miguel Cilieza y Velasco (1765–1767), appointed Bishop of Chiapas (Ciudad Real de Chiapas)
Antonio Larrazábal (1839–1846), never consecrated
Juan Félix de Jesús Zepeda, O.F.M. Obs. (1859–1861), appointed Bishop of Comayagua, Honduras
Juan José de Aycinena y Piñol (1859–1865)
osé María Barrutia y Croquer (1859–1864)
Emmanuele Francesco Barrutia y Croquer (1865–1879)
Miguel Angel García y Aráuz (1944–1951), appointed Bishop of Jalapa
Rafael González Estrada (1955–1984)
Mario Casariego y Acevedo, C.R.S. (1958–1963), appointed Coadjutor here; future Cardinal
José Ramiro Pellecer Samayoa (1967–2010)
James Richard Ham, M.M. (1967–1979)
Luis Mario Martínez de Lejarza Valle, S.J. (1968–1980) 
Eduardo Ernesto Fuentes Duarte (1980–1982), appointed Coadjutor Bishop of Sololá
Julio Amílcar Bethancourt Fioravanti (1982–1984), appointed Bishop of San Marcos
Juan José Gerardi Conedera (1984–1998)
Mario Enrique Ríos Mont, C.M. (1987–2010)
Gonzalo de Villa y Vásquez, S.J. (2004–2007), appointed Bishop of Sololá-Chimaltenango
Gustavo Rodolfo Mendoza Hernández (2004–2016)
Raúl Antonio Martinez Paredes (2007–)
José Cayetano Parra Novo, O.P. (2016–)

Other priests of this diocese who became bishops
Jorge de Viteri y Ungo, appointed Bishop of San Salvador in 1843
José Cándido Piñol y Batres, appointed Bishop of Granada, Nicaragua in 1913
Jorge García Caballeros, appointed Bishop of Quetzaltenango, Los Altos in 1928
Pablo Vizcaíno Prado, appointed Bishop of Suchitepéquez-Retalhuleu in 1996
Victor Hugo Palma Paúl, appointed Coadjutor Bishop of Escuintla in 2001
Álvaro Leonel Ramazzini Imeri, appointed Bishop of San Marcos in 2008; elevated as Cardinal in 2019
Carlos Enrique Trinidad Gómez, appointed Bishop of San Marcos in 2014

Churches
 

Iglesia Católica Sagrado Corazón de Jesus, Guatemala City
Iglesia de Cristo Pinares del Nort

References

Santiago de Guatemala
1534 establishments in the Spanish Empire
Religious organizations established in the 1530s
Roman Catholic dioceses established in the 16th century
A